Kyla La Grange (born 25 July 1986) is an English singer and songwriter from Watford, England.

Career

Early life
She studied at Rickmansworth School in Croxley Green, Hertfordshire. Her mother is South African, while her father is from Rhodesia (modern-day Zimbabwe) though both live in England. She achieved a 2.1 in philosophy, studying at Pembroke College, Cambridge from 2004-07. In June 2012, Kyla headlined the Guardian New Band of the Day gig.

Ashes (2011-2012)
Kyla had early success on the Amazing Radio new music chart. 'Walk Through Walls' was number one for 5 weeks in March and April 2011, and 'Been Better' topped the chart for 4 weeks in July. These were subsequently the top two songs in the year-end chart. Her debut album Ashes was produced by Brett Shaw at 123 Studios in East London, with two tracks produced by Marky Bates and was released on 30 July 2012. All the songs on the album were written by  La Grange, except "Love You Better" which is a cover of The Maccabees song from the album Wall of Arms. "Been Better", "Heavy Stone", "Vampire Smile" and "Walk Through Walls" were released as singles. In addition to these singles, "I Could Be" was released as an iTunes Free Single of the Week in August 2012.

Cut Your Teeth (2014)
La Grange's second studio album, entitled Cut Your Teeth was released on 2 June 2014 and was preceded by an eponymous single and a second single "The Knife". The album explores minimalistic Electronica music produced by electronic producer Jakwob.

While Your Heart's Still Beating (2015-present)
In 2015, she released two new singles called "So Sweet" and "Skin". She released a song called "Hummingbird" in late April 2016, and another, "Justify", in December 2016.

She provided backing vocals on :Jinnwoo's debut album Strangers Bring Me No Light, released in September 2016.

Discography

Albums

Singles

References

External links
 

1986 births
Living people
Alumni of Pembroke College, Cambridge
English people of South African descent
English people of Zimbabwean descent
English people of Swazi descent
People from Watford
Musicians from Hertfordshire
21st-century English women singers
21st-century English singers